Lepidochrysops poseidon, the Baviaanskloof blue, is a species of butterfly in the family Lycaenidae. It is endemic to South Africa.

The wingspan is 34–40 mm for males and 34–36 mm for females. Adults are on wing from late November to February.

References

Lepidochrysops
Butterflies described in 1987
Endemic butterflies of South Africa
Taxonomy articles created by Polbot